Araber Rahaman (died 28 April 2013) was an Indian politician. He was the Tripura MLA for Boxanagar from 1978–1988.

References

2013 deaths
Tripura politicians
Year of birth missing
20th-century Bengalis
21st-century Bengalis